Ever Since Eve is a 1921 American silent drama film directed by Howard M. Mitchell and starring Shirley Mason, Herbert Heyes and Eva Gordon.

Plot summary

Cast
 Shirley Mason as Célestine Le Farge
 Herbert Heyes as Carteret
 Eva Gordon as Lorita
 Eunice Murdock Moore as Svenson 
 Charles Spere as Percy Goring
 Frances Hancock as Mrs. Kerry
 Ethel Lynne as The Stranger
 Louis King as Lieutenant Gerald O'Connor

References

Bibliography
 Munden, Kenneth White. The American Film Institute Catalog of Motion Pictures Produced in the United States, Part 1. University of California Press, 1997.

External links
 
 
 
 

1921 films
1921 drama films
1920s English-language films
American silent feature films
Silent American drama films
American black-and-white films
Films directed by Howard M. Mitchell
Fox Film films
1920s American films